The FIBA Africa Championship 1975 was hosted by Egypt from December 20 to December 28, 1975.  The games were played in Alexandria.  Egypt won the tournament, its fourth African Championship, and a berth in the 1976 Summer Olympics by going undefeated in the round robin format.

Competing Nations
The following national teams competed:

Round robin

External links
 FIBA Archive

1975 in Egyptian sport
1975 in African basketball
AfroBasket
International basketball competitions hosted by Egypt
December 1975 sports events in Africa